Jan Einar Thorsen (born August 31, 1966) is a former Norwegian Alpine skier, active between 1987 and 1994. He won three World Cup victories, two in Super-G and one in Giant Slalom. In addition he won the World Cup title for Super G in 1994. At the 1992 Olympics in Albertville, Thorsen won a bronze medal in the Super-G, and in addition came fifth in the Downhill. At the 1994 Olympics in Lillehammer, Thorsen just missed out on another Olympic medal - he came fourth in the Giant Slalom.

World Cup victories

References

External links
 

Norwegian male alpine skiers
Olympic alpine skiers of Norway
1966 births
Living people
Olympic bronze medalists for Norway
Alpine skiers at the 1988 Winter Olympics
Alpine skiers at the 1992 Winter Olympics
Alpine skiers at the 1994 Winter Olympics
Olympic medalists in alpine skiing
FIS Alpine Ski World Cup champions
Medalists at the 1992 Winter Olympics